Ardagh (Ardachadh or Ard-achadh, meaning "high field" in Irish; modern Irish: Ardach) may refer to:

Places
 Ardagh, County Antrim, a townland in County Antrim, Northern Ireland
 Ardagh, County Cork
 Ardagh, County Donegal
 Ardagh, County Limerick
 Ardagh Hoard, found in 1868
 Ardagh, County Londonderry, a townland in County Londonderry, Northern Ireland
 Ardagh, County Longford
Ardagh (barony), in County Longford
 Ardagh, County Mayo, south of Ballina
 Ardagh, County Sligo; see List of townlands of County Sligo

Other uses
Ardagh (surname)
Ardagh Glass Group